Fred Hilton Morgan (30 June 1893 – 29 July 1980) was a South African sport shooter who competed in the 1920 Summer Olympics.

In 1920 he won the silver medal with the South African team in the team 600 metre military rifle, prone competition. He also participated in the following events:

 Team 300 and 600 metre military rifle, prone - fifth place
 Team 300 metre military rifle, standing - ninth place
 Team 300 metre military rifle, prone - eighth place
 Team 50 metre small-bore rifle - eighth place
 Team free rifle - tenth place
 50 metre small-bore rifle - result unknown
 300 metre free rifle, three positions - result unknown

References

External links
profile

1893 births
1980 deaths
South African male sport shooters
ISSF rifle shooters
Olympic shooters of South Africa
Shooters at the 1920 Summer Olympics
Olympic silver medalists for South Africa
Sportspeople from Johannesburg
Olympic medalists in shooting
Medalists at the 1920 Summer Olympics
South African Republic people
South African emigrants to Rhodesia